Karim Elsayed (born 16 February 1995) is an Egyptian canoeist. He competed in the men's K-1 200 metres event at the 2016 Summer Olympics.

References

1995 births
Living people
Egyptian male canoeists
Olympic canoeists of Egypt
Canoeists at the 2016 Summer Olympics
Place of birth missing (living people)